Elizabeth Gould, née Coxen (1804—1841), was a British artist and illustrator at the forefront of the natural history movement. Elizabeth traveled and worked alongside her husband, naturalist and author John Gould. She produced illustrations and lithographs for ornithological works, including plates in Darwin's The Zoology of the Voyage of H.M.S. Beagle and the Goulds' seminal work The Birds of Australia. In total, Elizabeth is accredited to at least 650 works.

Life and artistic career

Elizabeth was born on 18 July 1804 in Ramsgate, England to a military family. Little is known of her early life, however it is likely that Elizabeth underwent training in drawing and botany from a young age. In Victorian England, botany and natural history were part of the education of girls in middle-class English families. As Ann Moyal stated, “Cultivated women drew, walked, observed, collected specimens, arranged and painted." After this, at twenty-two, Elizabeth was employed as a governess, and lived in James Street, London. It is known that  She met John Gould through her brother, Charles Coxen, who was also an taxidermist. She married John Gould in January 1829, both 24 years old. Elizabeth began her professional work-life by producing ornithological drawings intended to supplement John's ornithological writing in letters to colleagues. Her first published work was in 1832 with A Century of Birds from the Himalaya Mountains. With lack of a publisher, the Goulds decided to publish it themselves.  In the early days of the couple’s relationship/partnership, Elizabeth provided an income for her family through selling her drawings. John encouraged her to learn lithography and asked his collaborator Edward Lear to teach her.
The extent of Lear's direct influence on the artist is uncertain, but they moved in a circle of artists and natural historians working on similar publications. Elizabeth's work entailed making designs, compositions, and detailed observations of depictions of exotic birds. This was so that the works could then be made into lithographic reproductions. In addition to this, Elizabeth also made watercolor paintings accompanied with color keys for colorists to copy. All of this group were enthused with the depiction and scientific illustration of the unknown animals found on European expeditions, especially the novelties in English collections of Australian birds and mammals.
Once proficient with the art form, she created illustrations from John's more rudimentary drawings. It is important to note that Elizabeth’s knowledge of art and her skills were not handed to her by her husband. John and Elizabeth’s skills were complementary and the pair worked together to create significant advances in the world of natural history and ornithology. The Goulds skillfully appealed to the aesthetic value of nature while educating those around them of new species. They nurtured a want for the representations of birds and other species within their works.
 In her eleven year career(1830-1841) she designed, lithographed, and painted more than 650 plates which appeared in:

A Century of Birds from the Himalaya Mountains (1831 and 1832). 80 plates. For this book, she worked with taxidermied birds.
The Birds of Europe (1832–37). 380 plates. For this book, live (caged) birds were available for her reference. This is when her signature style of ornate backgrounds and realistic shading were first realized. Lithography allowed for more realistic textures, such as feathers and fluff.
A Monograph of the Ramphastidae, or Family of Toucans (1834). 24 plates.
A Monograph of the Trogonidae, or family of trogons (1835–38). Most of the 36 plates.
The Zoology of the Voyage of H.M.S. Beagle, pt. III. Birds (1838). Gould created all 50 plates for this work but is uncredited.
A Synopsis of the Birds of Australia (1837–38).120 plates.
The Birds of Australia (1837–38). 84 plates, as well as an unspecified number of designs. This was the Gould's biggest and most ambitious project. Elizabeth sketched these subjects alive. Her most famous work is an image of the fairy wren (then known as the blue warbler).
The Birds of Australia (1840–48). Many of the 681 hand-coloured plates prepared by Gould have been digitised by the State Library of New South Wales.
Icones avium, or, Figures and descriptions of new and interesting species of birds from various parts of the globe (1837–38). 20 plates.
Her early illustrations have been described as stiff, but subsequently improved with experience. They remained quite formal compositions due to their use in ornithological classification.

The Goulds and the oldest of their surviving 4 children travelled to Australia in 1838. Elizabeth spent much of her time in Hobart as a guest of Jane Franklin.  While John travelled extensively collecting specimens, Elizabeth drew and painted specimens. Her brother Charles Coxen also immigrated to Australia, where he and his wife Elizabeth Coxen, who were also interested in natural history, became members of the Queensland Philosophical Society.

While in Australia, Elizabeth made hundreds of drawings from specimens for the publications Birds of Australia and A Monograph of the Macropodidæ, or Family of Kangaroos, as well as illustrations for the ornithology volume of Charles Darwin’s Zoology of the Voyage of HMS Beagle.

She bore one son while living in Australia, and gave birth to their eighth child when they returned to England in 1840. Elizabeth did not live to see the completion of her research, dying of puerperal fever shortly after the birth of her last child.

Gould completed 84 plates for The Birds of Australia before her death. Henry Constantine Richter (H.C. Richter) was employed by John Gould following Elizabeth’s passing. He worked on completing the illustrations in The Birds of Australia. The sketches of Elizabeth and H.C. Richter are notably difficult to distinguish from each other. Likely, her sketches informed the work of H.C. Richter. Though new artists were found to illustrate John’s books, it is evident that he was devastated by the loss of Elizabeth. He never remarried and honored his wife for how much she provided to his work 

A complete account of her life, The Story of Elizabeth Gould, was published by Alec Chisholm in 1944. Little was known about her until 1938 when a collection of her letters written from Australia was discovered. These letters were the basis for the book. Now housed in the Mitchell Library, the letters reveal her as a charming, cultured, and musically and artistically talented woman. Although the Goulds spent less than two years in Australia, the monumental seven-volume publication The Birds of Australia remains the definitive work on the subject.

The Gouldian finch (Chloebia gouldiae) and Mrs. Gould's sunbird (Aethopyga gouldiae) were named in her honor. John Gould named the Gouldian Finch in memory of his wife, stating "It was with feelings of the purest affection that I ventured, in the folio edition, to dedicate this lovely bird to the memory of my late wife, who for many years laboriously assisted me with her pencil, accompanied me to Australia, and cheerfully interested herself in all my pursuits." Mrs. Gould's sunbird was also named for Elizabeth, this time by Nicholas Vigors, a friend of the Gould's and contributor to John Gould's work.

Attribution and contemporary scholarship
There is a growing body of critical research exploring the attribution of Elizabeth's work to her husband. His own role in producing the lithographs has been questioned and examples of his style of drawing have been submitted to suggest that the actual drawing and coloring is likely the sole work of Elizabeth. Her role as sole artist of their first collection A Century of Birds from the Himalaya Mountains was acknowledged on every lithograph with the attribution "Drawn from Nature and on Stone by E. Gould."  Subsequent collections used "J & E Gould." The Birds of Australia includes a number of attributions to "J & E Gould." However, scholars feel that Elizabeth's exhaustive work creating an archive of preparatory drawings for the lithographs before her death was not adequately recognized.

Portrayals in popular media
 Melissa Ashley, The Birdman's Wife, Affirm Press, 2016, historical fiction. In the 2017 Queensland Literary Awards, the novel won the University of Queensland Fiction Book Award.

Gallery

See also
List of wildlife artists

Notes

References

Further reading
Newman, Alexandra K. "Elizabeth Gould: An Accomplished Woman." Unbound: Smithsonian Libraries. 

Chisholm, A.H. (1944) The story of Elizabeth Gould
Gould, E. Mrs Elizabeth Gould collection of drawings of Australian plants, flowers and foliage, 1838-42

External links

 Works by John and Elizabeth Gould held by the Royal Geographical Society of South Australia
John Gould's Birds of Australia
Linda Hall Library Portraits of 12 Scientific Illustrators from the 17th to the 21st Century

English illustrators
Scientific illustrators
1804 births
1841 deaths
People from Ramsgate
Australian bird artists
British bird artists
19th-century British painters
Deaths in childbirth